The 2015 Men's South American Volleyball Championship was the 31st edition of the Men's South American Volleyball Championship, organised by South America's governing volleyball body, the Confederación Sudamericana de Voleibol (CSV). The tournament was played in Maceió, Brazil. Brazil won its 30th title with Sérgio Santos being elected Most Valuable Player.

Pools composition

Squads

Preliminary round
All times are Brasília Time (UTC−03:00).

Pool A

|}

|}

Pool B

|}

|}

Final round
All times are Brasília Time (UTC−03:00).

7th–8th places

7th place match

|}

5th–6th places

5th place match

|}

Final four

Semifinals

|}

3rd place match

|}

Final

|}

Final standing

Awards

Most Valuable Player
 Sérgio Santos
Best Setter
 Bruno Rezende
Best Outside Spikers
 Rodrigo Quiroga
 Ronald Jiménez

Best Middle Blockers
 Facundo Imhoff
 Isac Santos
Best Opposite Spiker
 Evandro Guerra
Best Libero
 Facundo Santucci

References

External links
Official website

Men's South American Volleyball Championships
South American Volleyball Championship
2015 in Brazilian sport
Maceió
International volleyball competitions hosted by Brazil
2015 in South American sport
September 2015 sports events in South America
October 2015 sports events in South America